Henry Ashby may refer to:

Henry Ashby (paediatrician) (1846–1908) in England
Henry Marshall Ashby (1836–1868), Confederate States Army colonel
Henry Ashby (footballer) (1875–1926), English football full back

See also
Harry Ashby (disambiguation)
Henry Ashby Turner (1932–2008), American historian of Germany